Sarah Field may refer to:
 Sarah Fyge Egerton or Field, English poet
 Sarah Field (rugby league)